Erik Vlček (born 29 December 1981) is a Slovak sprint canoer who has competed since the late 1990s. He is a member of the Hungarian community in Slovakia.

Competing in five Summer Olympics, he won three medals in the K-4 1000 m event with a silver in 2008, 2016 and a bronze in 2004.

Vlček also won fifteen medals at the ICF Canoe Sprint World Championships with ten golds (K-4 500 m: 2002, 2003, 2006, 2007; K-4 1000 m: 2002, 2003, 2015; K-2 1000 m: 2011, 2014 and K-2 500 m: 2014), two silvers (K-4 200 m: 2009, K-4 1000 m: 2005), and three bronzes (K-4 500 m: 2001, K-4 1000 m: 2007, 2009).

He has been a scholarship holder with the Olympic Solidarity program since August 2002. Vlček is a member of the ŠKP club in Bratislava. He is 189 cm (6'2") tall and weighs 89 kg (196 lb).

References

External links
 
 
 
 
 Erik Vlček at the Slovenský Olympijský Výbor 
 
 
 

1981 births
Canoeists at the 2000 Summer Olympics
Canoeists at the 2004 Summer Olympics
Canoeists at the 2008 Summer Olympics
Canoeists at the 2012 Summer Olympics
Canoeists at the 2016 Summer Olympics
Canoeists at the 2020 Summer Olympics
Living people
Olympic canoeists of Slovakia
Olympic silver medalists for Slovakia
Olympic bronze medalists for Slovakia
Slovak male canoeists
Olympic medalists in canoeing
Sportspeople from Komárno
Hungarians in Slovakia
ICF Canoe Sprint World Championships medalists in kayak
Medalists at the 2008 Summer Olympics
Medalists at the 2004 Summer Olympics
Medalists at the 2012 Summer Olympics
Medalists at the 2020 Summer Olympics
Canoeists at the 2015 European Games
Canoeists at the 2019 European Games
European Games medalists in canoeing
European Games bronze medalists for Slovakia